Jerome F. Keating is an American writer and academic.

Career
He worked on the Taipei and Kaohsiung Mass Rapid Transit projects as the technology transfer manager. Keating first taught in Taiwan at Chinese Culture University before moving to National Taipei University. He is an established author in Taiwan known for his dislike of both the KMT and CCP.

He regularly writes op-eds for the Taipei Times. He currently lives in Taipei, Taiwan.

Books
Island in the Stream
Taiwan: the Struggles of a Democracy
Taiwan the Search for Identity
The Mapping of Taiwan
The Paradigms that Guide Our Lives and Drive Our Souls
Taiwan: The Struggle Gains Focus

References

American writers
Academic staff of the Chinese Culture University
Academic staff of the National Taipei University
Living people
Year of birth missing (living people)